SWR Fernsehen is a German regional television channel targeting the states of Baden-Württemberg and Rhineland-Palatinate. It is produced by Südwestrundfunk (SWR) and is one of eight regional "third channels" broadcast by the ARD members.

History
The channel started on 5 April 1969 as a collaboration between Süddeutscher Rundfunk (SDR), Südwestfunk (SWF) and SR named "Südwest 3". SDR and SWF merged in 1998 to form SWR and the channel was renamed "Südwest Fernsehen". The name "SWR Fernsehen" was adopted in September 2006.

The channel is available in two different versions:
SWR Fernsehen BW for Baden-Württemberg.
SWR Fernsehen RP for Rhineland-Palatinate.
The different versions broadcasts local news updates during the afternoon and a longer block with local broadcasts in the evening. About 70 percent of the programming is common, while 30 percent is broadcast regionally.

They are somewhat infamous for a series of highly graphic PSAs they produced in the 1990s and 2000s, some of which included famously violent scenes from popular movies such as Hellraiser, Pulp Fiction, American Psycho and Goodfellas.

Selected programmes
Alfons und Gäste
Die Fallers – Die SWR Schwarzwaldserie (soap opera)
Die Pierre M. Krause Show (late-night show)
Landesschau Baden-Württemberg
Landesschau Rheinland-Pfalz
 (talk show)
Report Mainz
Sag die Wahrheit (game show)
Spätschicht (comedy)
Tatort (police procedural)
Verstehen Sie Spaß?

References

External links

 

Südwestrundfunk
Television stations in Germany
Television channels and stations established in 1969